Dré Saris (19 June 1920 – 14 June 2005) was a Dutch footballer. He played in one match for the Netherlands national football team in 1949. He played from 1938 until 1958 as goalkeeper for BVV.

References

External links
 

1920 births
2005 deaths
Dutch footballers
Netherlands international footballers
Place of birth missing
Association footballers not categorized by position